Team Bulldog: Off-Duty Investigation is a 2020 South Korean television series starring Cha Tae-hyun, Lee Sun-bin, Jung Sang-hoon, Yoon Kyung-ho and Ji Seung-hyun. It is the third series of OCN's "Dramatic Cinema" project which combines film and drama formats. It aired from May 23 to June 28, 2020.

Synopsis
Known as an enthusiastic and impressively effective detective, Jin Kang-ho (Cha Tae-hyun) will stop at nothing to catch criminals he’s assigned to pursue. With the passion to solve the unsolvable cases, Kang-ho finds it’s better to work alone. Or so it was, until the day he meet Kang Moo-young (Lee Sun-bin), the overly zealous producer of a low-rated investigative program. Moo-young is as enthusiastic about solving cases and catching criminals as Kang-ho. The two then agree to team up and work together.

Cast

Main
 Cha Tae-hyun as Jin Kang-ho
 Lee Sun-bin as Kang Moo-young
 Jung Sang-hoon as Lee Pan-seok
 Yoon Kyung-ho as Teddy Jung
 Ji Seung-hyun as Tak-won

Supporting
 Park Jung-woo as Min Dae-jin
 Park Tae-san as Manson
 Jang Jin-hee as senior
 Im Chul-hyung as Seo In-jae
 Son Kwang-eop as director
 Lee Yeong-seok as shoemaker
 Song Yoo-hyun as Hong PD
 Ji Chan as Jang Min-gi
 Son Byung-wook as Kang-soo
 Park Sung-joon as Kang Moo-taek	
 Lee Ha-ni as Jang Sung-soo
 Kwon Hyuk-beom as Lee Tae-sung
 Cho Seung-yeon as Yoo Sung-gook
 Seo Hye-won as Cho So-yoo
 Jung Yoon-seo as Choi Mi-na / Jang Do-il
 Jung Chan-bi as Ga-eun
 Cha Woo-jin as Park Hyun-gu

Special appearances
 Kim Kwang-kyu as gang boss (Ep. 1)
 Ma Dong-seok as Jin Woo-taek
 Han Ki-woong as Kim Min-seok
 Han Ki-won as Kim Min-soo

Viewership

Notes

References

External links
  
 
 

OCN television dramas
Korean-language television shows
2020 South Korean television series debuts
2020 South Korean television series endings
South Korean action television series
South Korean crime television series
Television series by Zium Content